Maine Pyar Kiya is a 1989 Indian Hindi-language romantic musical film directed by Sooraj Barjatya, who co-wrote the film with S.M. Ahale. Produced by Rajshri Productions, the film stars Salman Khan and Bhagyashree. It marked the debuts of Barjatya and Bhagyashree. Principal photography took place in Mumbai and Ooty. The film score and soundtrack was composed by Raamlaxman while Asad Bhopali wrote the lyrics.
 
Maine Pyar Kiya is considered one of the most iconic romantic films ever made and became a cult favorite from its songs, dialogues and chemistry of Khan and Bhagyashree. It also won six Filmfare Awards.

Plot 
Karan is a poor mechanic who lives in the countryside with his only daughter, Suman. He decides to try his luck in business and travel to Dubai so he can earn enough to get his daughter married. Thus, he decides to leave her with his old friend Kishan. Kishan, now a wealthy businessman in a big city, allows Suman to stay at his house while her father is away as he cannot turn down his old friend's request. Suman is befriended by Kishan's young son Prem, who assures her that a boy and a girl can be platonic friends.

Prem takes Suman to a party organised by Seema, who is the only daughter of Kishan's business partner, Ranjeet. Jeevan, nephew of Ranjeet, is proud and arrogant, and humiliates Suman and Prem, accusing them of falsely claiming to be "just friends". Suman leaves the party in tears and distances herself from Prem. At that point, Prem and Suman both realise that they have fallen in love with each other.

Prem's mother Kaushalya probes deeper into Prem and Suman's relationship and approves of Suman as her daughter-in-law. Kishan, however, disapproves of the relationship as he is of the opinion that Karan is of a lower status than he is, and is further brainwashed by Ranjeet who claims that Suman has taken advantage of his hospitality and is feigning love for Prem to marry into his wealthy family. He asks her to leave his house. Karan returns from abroad just then, and is enraged at Kishan's behaviour. Kishan accuses him of plotting to set up Suman with Prem. Karan and Kishan quarrel, and part ways thence. Eventually, Karan and Suman return to their village, deeply humiliated.

Prem learns about what had transpired and refuses to accept the separation, so he goes to Suman's village and begs to be allowed to marry her. Karan, angered by Kishan's behaviour, initially refuses, but eventually says he will allow the marriage on one condition: Prem must prove that he can support his wife through his own effort and live separately. Prem accepts the challenge and begins to work as a truck driver and labourer in the nearby quarry. At the end of the month, Prem earns the required money. On the way to Karan's house, he is ambushed by Jeevan and a group of ruffians who attempt to kill him. He survives, but the currency notes of his wages are all ruined in the fight.

Karan harshly dismisses Prem's effort on seeing the soiled notes and disbelieves Prem's story about the ruffians' attack. Prem then begs for another chance to prove himself. His sincere determination melts Karan's heart and he agrees to allow his daughter to marry Prem. Meanwhile, Ranjeet goes to Prem's father and tells him that Karan has killed his son. Unable to believe this, Kishan travels to Karan's village, only to find Prem alive and well. When Prem confronts Jeevan, Ranjeet and his supporters manhandle both Kishan and Karan, while Jeevan abducts Suman. In the end, Prem, Karan and Kishan join hands to defeat a common enemy — Ranjeet, his nephew Jeevan and Ranjeet's supporters, and then save Suman. Rangeet's leg is broken in the fight, and he and his supporters are arrested.  Jeevan is chased to a cliff by Prem, where Suman falls and hangs off a branch. After a fight with Jeeven, Prem attempts to lower himself down with a rope to save her, and Jeeven is attacked by a dove (the same one that he tried to kill earlier but was stopped by Suman), till he falls off the cliff. Suman and Prem climb up the cliff to safety. Jeeven, who is hanging on the branch, attemps to intervene, but instead is put into greater risk, and, finally, is pecked in the face by the bird and falls to his death just as a mining bomb explodes. Karan and Kishan's estrangement comes to an end, and Prem and Suman marry.

Cast
Salman Khan as Prem Chaudhary
Bhagyashree as Suman 
Aloknath as Karan
Rajeev Verma as Kishan Kumar Chaudhary
Reema Lagoo as Kaushalya Chaudhary
Ajit Vachani as Ranjeet 
Mohnish Bahl as Jeevan 
Laxmikant Berde as Manohar Singh
Harish Patel as Rahim
Huma Khan as Gulabiya
Pervin Dastur as Seema 
Dilip Joshi as Ramlal "Ramu" Singh
Deep Dhillon as Lal 
Raju Shrivastava as Shambhu
Shreechand Makhija as Prabhu

Production

Casting 
The casting of the lead actor was complex. Several newcomers were auditioned for the role of 'Prem', including Vindu Dara Singh, Deepak Tijori, and Faraaz Khan. While Faraaz Khan, son
of the actor Yusuf Khan who played the villainous Zabisco in Amar Akbar Anthony (1977), was almost finalised for the role, but he was replaced at the last minute due to health issues. Barjatya tested Shabina Dutt for the lead actress role. Dutt failed the screen test and Barjatya asked if she could suggest an actor for the lead. She suggested Salman Khan, with whom she had done an ad film. Salman Khan was not particularly interested because of the soft nature of the film and Barjatya was not very happy with the Khan's first audition. Sooraj wasn't convinced with Salman's acting prowess and started looking for another actor to play the role. Khan too, started suggesting names for who could be Prem in the film, after he was told that he didn't fit the bill. Barjatya eventually convinced him to do it, and Khan has since then expressed his gratitude to Barjatya for making him a star. Barjatya loved Tom Cruise's Top Gun jacket so much that he designed a one on the similar lines for Khan in Maine Pyar Kiya. Like Tom Cruise's jacket, which had patches of logos and emblems of the American Army, Navy and Air Force insignia, and other badges from the defence forces, Khan's jacket too had similar insignias pasted on it. Barjatya then cast Bhagyashree to star opposite Salman Khan. Bhagyashree, who had a lead role in Amol Palekar's TV show Kachchi Dhoop, had refused to do the film as she wanted to pursue higher studies. Barjatya made several changes to the script; Bhagyashree eventually agreed to do the film. Though Salman recommended Bahl for villain's role, veteran actress and Mohnish Bahl's mother Nutan was not happy with her son playing villain's role in the film. Nutan, who shared a good rapport with the Barjatyas, had reportedly also asked if Mohnish could fit in other roles. Makers assured her that Bahl's character would be remembered for a long time to come. Barjatya picked Perveen from the English stage to play the negative role. The film also marked the debut of Laxmikant Berde.

Filming 
Prior to the film's production, Rajshri Productions was struggling financially, and was on the verge of closing down. Director/writer Sooraj Barjatya's father Rajkumar Barjatya suggested the story of Maine Pyar Kiya and His Father's Friend was Legendary filmmaker Tarun Majumdar suggested the script of Maine Pyar Kiya. Barjatya spent ten months writing the screenplay for Maine Pyar Kiya. Bhagyashree got paid  while Salman Khan was paid  for the film. In addition to the production budget, another  was spent on the soundtrack's radio publicity. The first sequence filmed was the office scene where Rajiv Verma tells Salman that he has to go. Barjatya had large sets in Film City, Mumbai, where filming took place continuously over 5 to 6 months. The outdoor scenes were filmed in Ooty. Additional production credits include dance choreographer — Jay Borade, art—Bijon Das Gupta, action—Shamim Azim and editor—Mukhtar Ahmed.

Music 

The soundtrack album and musical score were composed by Raamlaxman, while the lyrics were written by Dev Kohli and Asad Bhopali. It was produced under the Saregama label and featured singers such as Lata Mangeshkar, S. P. Balasubrahmanyam and Sharda Sinha. The soundtrack consists of 11 songs including the "Antakshari" (excerpts from different Bollywood songs), which was used when the characters play a game. The soundtrack was very successful upon release, becoming the best-selling Bollywood soundtrack of the decade. The film's soundtrack album sold over 10million units, and became the best-selling soundtrack of the year and the decade (an accolade that it shares with the soundtrack of the 1989 film Chandni). It gave a thrust to the career of Raamlaxman, who, although existed since the 1970s and was composing for mainstream movies, was yet to find popularity. Planet Bollywood ranked the album in the fifth position on their list of "100 Greatest Bollywood Soundtracks of Hindi cinema".

Several songs of the film were heavily influenced by western hits. "Aate Jaate Hanste Gaate" was a total note-by-note lift from Stevie Wonder's "I Just Called to Say I Love You". "Aaya Mausam Dosti Ka" features a guitar riff used as a prelude and interlude that is lifted from the millennial whoop (Oh Oh Oh Oh Oh Oh Ho portion) from the song "Tarzan Boy" by Baltimora from the album Living in the Background. Another song from the movie that was inspired from a western hit was "Mere Rang Mein Rangne Wali". The keyboard riff that plays at the initiation of the song (peculiarly picturised on a saxophone) is ripped from the keyboard riff of "The Final Countdown" by the Swedish band Europe. The first few lines of the song, "Mere Rang Mein" to the peak at "Mere Sawalon ka Jawab Do", were also partly inspired from the initial portions of Francis Lai’s "Theme from Love Story".

Release 
Maine Pyar Kiya premiered on 29 December 1989 across India. The film initially saw a very limited release, with only 29 prints, before later going on to add a thousand more as the film picked up. Maine Pyar Kiya was dubbed in English as When Love Calls. A 125-minute version was the biggest hit in the Caribbean market in Guyana and also dominated the box-office collections in Trinidad and Tobago. The Telugu version Prema Paavuraalu ran for more than 200 days; 25 weeks at Visakhapatnam and had 100 plus day run at six centres in Andhra Pradesh. It was dubbed in Tamil-language as Kaadhal Oru Kavithai and in Malayalam as Ina Praavukal. Maine Pyar Kiya had also been dubbed in Spanish as Te Amo.

Reception

Box office 
The film was the biggest grosser of 1989 and one of India's highest-grossing films. Maine Pyar Kiya grossed 28crore, equivalent to  adjusted for inflation in 2017. It became the highest-grossing Indian film of the 1980s. In terms of ticket sales, the film is estimated to have sold at least more than 30million tickets in India. The film was a huge hit in the Caribbean and dominated the box-office that year in Guyana, and Trinidad and Tobago. The film saw a 10-week run in Lima and Peru. Box Office India described it as an "all-time blockbuster". The film's success drew comparisons to Sholay, with Manmohan Desai even calling Maine Pyar Kiya "the biggest hit since Alam Ara" (1931).

Critical response 
Maine Pyar Kiya received favorable reviews. Trade Guide lists it as one of the eight greatest hits ever. India Today summarized, "Music is one of the key ingredients of its success. The songs have melody; the feelings come through – a throwback to the '60s. Moreover Sooraj uses the songs to take his story further. It is also that touch of innocence". Sukanya Verma called, "Dil deewana appears first to celebrate Salman Khan and Bhagyashree’s happily-ever-after aspirations in Maine Pyar Kiya and once again when standard rich versus poor conflicts threaten its realisation." The Times of News wrote, "Sooraj Barjatiya’s Maine Pyar Kiya is one such classic film of the 90s that made Salman Khan an overnight star". Stardust said, "In the hands of a sincere director, the most hackneyed of commercial film plots can be made to look fresh and new. Unlike other young directors of his generation, Sooraj also knows the value of a good script and spends more time writing his script than in actual production."

Accolades

See also 

 List of highest-grossing Indian films

Notes

References

External links 
 Official site at Rajshri Productions
 
 Maine Pyar Kiya at British Film Institute
 

1980s Hindi-language films
1980s teen romance films
1989 directorial debut films
1989 films
1989 romantic drama films
Films about birds
Films directed by Sooraj Barjatya
Films about pets
Films scored by Raamlaxman
Indian romantic drama films
Indian teen romance films
Rajshri Productions films
Films shot in Mumbai
Films shot in Ooty